Conditional Release is a 2016 social drama Iranian film, directed and produced by Hossein Shahabi.

Cast
 Amir Jafari
 Shaghayegh Farahani
 Leila Otadi
 Amir Reza Delavari
 Diba Zahedi
 Ahmad Nikpour
 Alireza Sanifar
 Shokrkhoda Goodarzi
 Ramin Rastad
 Farshin Tahmaseb
 Vahid Rostampour
 Amir Dezhakam
 Mohammad Karhemmat
 Mohammad Akbari
 Ahmad Shahabi

References

External links
 

2016 films
Iranian independent films
Iranian drama films
Films set in Tehran
Films shot in Iran
Films directed by Hossein Shahabi